The Nokaan or Nhugarn were an Aboriginal Australian people of the Mid West region of Western Australia.

Country
The Nokaan dwelt on the plateau west of the Murchison, at least as far south from Curbur to Yallalong and Coolcalaya. Their inland extension to the south went close to Northampton.

Running clock-wise from north, their neighbours were the Malgana, Watjarri, Widi, then the Amangu south, and the Nanda directly east.

Alternative names
 Noga:n. (Malgana exonym)
 Nagadja.(easterners, an Amangu exonym for circumcised tribes lying to the east of Geraldton)
 Nagodja. (a Watjarri exonym)
 Ngadja.
 Akadja, Akady, Akadi.
 Wiludjanu. (Another Watjarri language-denoting exonym, signifying 'western talk').

Notes

Citations

Sources

Aboriginal peoples of Western Australia